Kofoidinium velleloides is a species of dinoflagellate belonging to the family Kofoidiniaceae.

The species inhabits marine environments.

References

Dinophyceae